East Timor participated at the 2018 Summer Youth Olympics in Buenos Aires, Argentina from 6 October to 18 October 2018.

Athletics

East Timor qualified 2 athletes.

Boys

Girls

References

Nations at the 2018 Summer Youth Olympics
Olympics
Olympics